The 2003–04 Argentine Primera B Nacional was the 18th season of second division professional football in Argentina. A total of 20 teams competed; the champion and runner-up were promoted to Argentine Primera División.

Club information

Torneo Apertura standings

Torneo Clausura standings

Overall standings

Promotion playoff
This leg was played between the Apertura Winner: Instituto, and the Clausura Winner: Almagro. The winning team was declared champion and was automatically promoted to 2004–05 Primera División and the losing team played the Second Promotion Playoff.

|-
!colspan="5"|Promotion Playoff

Second Promotion Playoff
This leg was played by Almagro, the losing team of the Promotion Playoff, and Huracán (TA), who was the best team in the overall standings. The winning team was promoted to 2004–05 Primera División and the losing team played the Promotion Playoff Primera División-Primera B Nacional.

|-
!colspan="5"|Promotion Playoff

Torneo Reducido
It was played by the teams placed 3rd and 5th, in the Overall Standings: Argentinos Juniors (3rd) and Godoy Cruz (5th). The winning team played the Promotion Playoff Primera División-Primera B Nacional.

|-
!colspan="5"|Final

Promotion playoff Primera División-Primera B Nacional
The Second Promotion playoff loser (Huracán (TA)) and the Torneo Reducido Winner (Argentinos Juniors) played against the 18th and the 17th placed of the Relegation Table of 2003–04 Primera División.

|-
!colspan="5"|Relegation/promotion playoff 1

|-
!colspan="5"|Relegation/promotion playoff 2

|-
|}
 Huracán (TA) was promoted to 2004–05 Primera División by winning the playoff and Atlético de Rafaela was relegated to the 2004–05 Primera B Nacional.
 Argentinos Juniors was promoted to 2004–05 Primera División by winning the playoff and Talleres (C) was relegated to the 2004–05 Primera B Nacional.

Relegation

Note: Clubs with indirect affiliation with AFA are relegated to the Torneo Argentino A, while clubs directly affiliated face relegation to Primera B Metropolitana. Clubs with direct affiliation are all from Greater Buenos Aires, with the exception of Newell's, Rosario Central, Central Córdoba and Argentino de Rosario, all from Rosario, and Unión and Colón from Santa Fe.

Metropolitana Zone

Interior Zone

Relegation playoff matches

|-
!colspan="5"|Relegation/promotion playoff 1 (Direct affiliation vs. Primera B Metropolitana)

|-
!colspan="5"|Relegation/promotion playoff 2 (Indirect affiliation vs. Torneo Argentino A)

|-
|}

 Unión remains in the Primera B Nacional by winning the playoff.
CAI remains in Primera B Nacional after a 1-1 aggregate tie by virtue of a "sports advantage". In case of a tie in goals, the team from the Primera B Nacional gets to stay in it.

See also
2003–04 in Argentine football

References

External links

Primera B Nacional seasons
2003–04 in Argentine football leagues